The 1913 Nobel Prize in Literature was awarded to the Bengali polymath Rabindranath Tagore (1861–1941) "because of his profoundly sensitive, fresh and beautiful verse, by which, with consummate skill, he has made his poetic thought, expressed in his own English words, a part of the literature of the West." He is the first and remains only the Indian recipient of the prize. The award stemmed from the idealistic and accessible (for Western readers) nature of a small body of translated material, including the translated Gitanjali.

Laureate

The literary works of Rabindranath Tagore are well established in both Indian and Western academic traditions. In addition to fiction in the form of poetry, songs, stories, and dramas, it also incorporates literary criticism, philosophy, and social issues. After translating his poems into English, Tagore, who initially wrote in Bengali, was able to appeal to a large audience in the West. His poetry was believed to portray the tranquility of the spirit in connection with nature, in contrast to the frenzied existence in the West. His world-renowned works include Gitanjali ("Song Offerings", 1910), Gora ("Fair-Faced", 1910) and Ghare-Baire ("The Home and the World", 1916).

Deliberations

Nominations
Rabindranath Tagore had not been nominated for the prize before 1913, making it one of the rare occasions when an author have been awarded the Nobel Prize in Literature the same year they were first nominated. He was nominated by British poet Thomas Sturge Moore (1870–1944), which led him to being awarded with the prize.

In total, the Swedish Academy received 32 nominations for 28 individuals. Among the repeated nominees include Pierre Loti, Verner von Heidenstam (awarded in 1916), Sven Hedin, Ángel Guimerá, Anatole France (awarded in 1921), John Morley, and Thomas Hardy. Nine of the nominees were newly nominated such as Edmond Picard, Jakob Knudsen, Henrik Pontoppidan (awarded in 1917), Émile Faguet, Edward Dowden, and John Lubbock, 1st Baron Avebury. The Italian writer Grazia Deledda, who was awarded in 1927 for the 1926 prize, was the only female nominee.

The authors Alfred Austin, Aluísio Azevedo, Eva Brag, Jules Claretie, Ferdinand de Saussure, Ferdinand Dugué, Louis Hémon, Friedrich Huch, Ștefan Octavian Iosif, Pauline Johnson, Ioan Kalinderu, Thomas Krag, Emily Lawless, Camille Lemonnier, Juhan Liiv, Charles Major, Oscar Méténier, Lesya Ukrainka, Alfred Russel Wallace, and Frances Julia Wedgwood died in 1913 without having been nominated for the prize. The Irish critic Edward Dowden and English polymath John Lubbock, 1st Baron Avebury died months before the announcement.

Prize decision
In 1913 the Nobel committee of the Swedish Academy considered 28 authors. The candidacy of Thomas Hardy, nominated by 97 members of the Royal Society of Literature, were dismissed by the committee on the grounds that his writing were considered too "pessimistic" to be in line with the Nobel prize donor Alfred Nobel's will. Similarly, Anatole France was considered a "sceptic", although he was eventually awarded the prize. The committee had only received one nomination for Tagore, and despite that Tagore was only known to the members of Swedish Academy in a few English translations he was awarded the prize. Committee member Per Hallström declared in a report that "...no poet in Europe since the death of Goethe in 1832 can rival Tagore....". To the poet Verner von Heidenstam, himself awarded in 1916, Tagore was the "discovering [of] a great name".

Theft of Nobel Prize
Tagore's Nobel Prize and a number of his other possessions were stolen from the Visva-Bharati University's security vault on March 25, 2004. The Swedish Academy took the decision to give the University two copies of Tagore's Nobel Prize, one made of gold and the other of bronze, on December 7, 2004. It inspired the fictional film Nobel Chor. A baul singer named Pradip Bauri was detained in 2016 after being suspected of providing the robbers with cover. The reward was then given back.

References

External links
Award ceremony speech by Harald Hjärne nobelprize.org

1913
Rabindranath Tagore